Serbia participated in the Junior Eurovision Song Contest 2018 in Minsk, Belarus with the song "Svet" performed by Bojana Radovanović. Radio Television of Serbia (RTS) was responsible for selecting their entry for the contest.

Background

In last year's contest Serbia got a tenth place with Jana Paunović and Irina Brodić and a song called "Ceo svet je naš".

Before Junior Eurovision
On 13 September 2018, it was announced that Bojana Radovanović would represent the country in Minsk, Belarus with a song called "Svet".

Artist and song information

Bojana Radovanović
Bojana Radovanović is a Serbian singer who represented Serbia at the  Junior Eurovision Song Contest 2018 with the song "Svet", finishing 19th. She participated in the Serbian contest Pinkove Zvezdice, reaching the superfinal. In early 2018, she released her first single, called "Dok ljubav ne osetiš".

At Junior Eurovision
During the opening ceremony and the running order draw which both took place on 19 November 2018, Serbia was drawn to perform tenth on 25 November 2018, following Ireland and preceding Italy.

Voting

Detailed voting results

References

Junior Eurovision Song Contest
Serbia
2018